Jasim Uddin Ahmed (born 1 January 1933) is a Bangladeshi language activist, nuclear scientist and writer. He was conferred with Ekushey Padak in 2016 for his contribution to the Language Movement.

Biography
Ahmed was born on 1 January 1933 at Galiarchar in Daudkandi of Comilla. He took part in the  Language Movement while a student at Dhaka University. He took part in protest rallies on 21 February 1952, demonstrations in which the police opened fire on the crowd. Abul Barkat was shot in front of him.

Ahmed started his academic career at Dhaka College in 1956 before moving to the United States to attain a PhD. He returned Bangladesh, joining the Atomic Energy Centre, Dhaka in 1963. He joined the International Atomic Energy Agency in 1970. Later, he became the head of Nuclear Radiation Security Department of the institution. He retired from the post in 1994.

Ahmed has written about 36 books, and received Ekushey Padak in 2016 for his contribution to the Language Movement. He made a special appearance on a television drama titled Noishobdo Joddha which was telecast on 19 February 2016 on ATN Bangla.

Ahmed's grandson is a Yale University student and CEO who has seen some public notoriety for his liberal political statements.

References

1933 births
Living people
People from Comilla District
Bengali language movement activists
Recipients of the Ekushey Padak
University of Dhaka alumni
Bangladeshi male writers
Bangladeshi male television actors
Bangladeshi physicists
Academic staff of Dhaka College